Alain Cantareil (born 15 August 1983) is a French professional footballer.

External links

Alain Cantareil profile at foot-national.com

1983 births
Living people
Footballers from Marseille
French footballers
Association football defenders
Olympique de Marseille players
Nîmes Olympique players
FC Lorient players
AC Ajaccio players
OGC Nice players
FC Rouen players
FC Istres players
Ligue 1 players
Ligue 2 players